The 2021 Idaho State Bengals football team represented Idaho State University in the Big Sky Conference during the 2021 NCAA Division I FCS football season. Led by fifth-year head coach Rob Phenicie, the Bengals finished at 1–10 (1–7 in Big Sky, twelfth) and played their home games on campus at Holt Arena in Pocatello, Idaho.

Previous season
The Bengals finished the 2020 season 2–4 to finish in sixth place.

Preseason

Polls
On July 26, 2021, during the virtual Big Sky Kickoff, the Bengals were predicted to finish ninth in the Big Sky by both the coaches and media.

Preseason All–Big Sky team
The Bengals had one player selected to the preseason all-Big Sky team.

Offense

Tanner Conner – WR

Schedule

Game summaries

No. 8 North Dakota

at Nevada

Sacramento State

at Northern Arizona

No. 7 UC Davis

at Portland State

at No. 8 Montana State

No. 23 Weber State

at No. 15 (FBS) BYU

at Cal Poly

Idaho

References

Idaho State
Idaho State Bengals football seasons
Idaho State Bengals football